National Route 305 is a national highway of Japan. The highway connects Kanazawa, Ishikawa and Minamiechizen, Fukui.

References

National highways in Japan
Roads in Fukui Prefecture
Roads in Ishikawa Prefecture